Lasiopogon is a genus of robber flies in the family Asilidae. There are at least 80 described species in Lasiopogon.

Species
These 82 species belong to the genus Lasiopogon:

 Lasiopogon actius (Melander, 1923) b
 Lasiopogon adrichii b
 Lasiopogon akaishii Hradsky, 1981 c g
 Lasiopogon albidus Cole and Wilcox, 1938 i c g
 Lasiopogon aldrichii Melander, 1923 i c g
 Lasiopogon apache Cannings, 2002 c g b
 Lasiopogon apenninus Bezzi, 1921 c g
 Lasiopogon appalachensis Cannings, 2002 c g b
 Lasiopogon arenicolus (Osten Sacken, 1877) i c g
 Lasiopogon aridus Cole and Wilcox, 1938 i
 Lasiopogon atripennis Cole and Wilcox, 1938 i
 Lasiopogon avetianae Richter, 1962 c g
 Lasiopogon bezzii Engel, 1929 c g
 Lasiopogon bivittatus Loew, 1866 i c g b
 Lasiopogon californicus Cole and Wilcox, 1938 i c g
 Lasiopogon canus Cole and Wilcox, 1938 i c g
 Lasiopogon carolinensis Cole and Wilcox, 1938 i
 Lasiopogon chaetosus Cole and Wilcox, 1938 i c g
 Lasiopogon chrysotus Cannings, 2002 c g
 Lasiopogon cinctus (Fabricius, 1781) c g
 Lasiopogon cinereus Cole, 1919 i c g b
 Lasiopogon coconino Cannings, 2002 c g
 Lasiopogon currani Cole & Wilcox, 1938 i c g b
 Lasiopogon delicatulus Melander, 1923 i c g
 Lasiopogon dimicki Cole and Wilcox, 1938 i c g
 Lasiopogon drabicola Cole, 1916 c g b
 Lasiopogon drabicolus Cole, 1916 i
 Lasiopogon eichingeri Hradsky, 1981 c g
 Lasiopogon flammeus Cannings, 2002 c g
 Lasiopogon fumipennis Melander, 1923 i c g b
 Lasiopogon gabrieli Cole & Wilcox, 1938 i c g b
 Lasiopogon gracilipes Bezzi, 1916 c g
 Lasiopogon hasanicus Lehr, 1984 c g
 Lasiopogon hinei Cole & Wilcox, 1938 i c g b
 Lasiopogon hirtellus (Meigen, 1820) c g
 Lasiopogon immaculatus Strobl, 1893 c g
 Lasiopogon kjachtensis Lehr, 1984 c g
 Lasiopogon lavignei Cannings, 2002 c g
 Lasiopogon lehri Cannings, 2002 c g
 Lasiopogon leleji Cannings, 2002 c g
 Lasiopogon littoris Cole, 1924 i c g b
 Lasiopogon macquarti (Perris, 1852) c g
 Lasiopogon marshalli Cannings, 2002 c g
 Lasiopogon martinorum Cole & Wilcox, 1938 c g
 Lasiopogon montanus Schiner, 1862 c g
 Lasiopogon monticola Melander, 1923 b
 Lasiopogon monticolus Melander, 1923 i c g
 Lasiopogon novus Lehr, 1984 c g
 Lasiopogon oklahomensis Cole & Wilcox, 1938 i c g b
 Lasiopogon opaculus Loew, 1874 i c g
 Lasiopogon pacificus Cole and Wilcox, 1938 i c g
 Lasiopogon peusi Hradsky, 1982 c g
 Lasiopogon phaeothysanotus Cannings, 2002 c g
 Lasiopogon piestolophus Cannings, 2002 c g
 Lasiopogon pilosellus Loew, 1847 c g
 Lasiopogon polensis Lavigne, 1969 i c g
 Lasiopogon primus Adisoemarto, 1967 i c g
 Lasiopogon pugeti Cole and Wilcox, 1938 i c g
 Lasiopogon qinghaiensis Cannings, 2002 c g
 Lasiopogon quadrivittatus Jones, 1907 i c g b
 Lasiopogon ripicolus Melander, 1923 i g
 Lasiopogon rokuroi Hradsky, 1981 c g
 Lasiopogon schizopygus Cannings, 2002 c g b
 Lasiopogon septentrionalis Lehr, 1984 c g
 Lasiopogon shermani Cole and Wilcox, 1938 i c g
 Lasiopogon slossonae Cole & Wilcox, 1938 i c g b
 Lasiopogon soffneri Hradsky, 1964 c g
 Lasiopogon solox Enderlein, 1914 c g
 Lasiopogon sorox Enderlein, 1914 g
 Lasiopogon tarsalis Loew, 1847 c g
 Lasiopogon terneicus Lehr, 1984 c g
 Lasiopogon terricola (Johnson, 1900) b
 Lasiopogon terricolus (Johnson, 1900) i c g
 Lasiopogon testaceus Cole and Wilcox, 1938 i c g
 Lasiopogon tetragrammus Loew, 1874 i c g b
 Lasiopogon trivittatus Melander, 1923 i c g
 Lasiopogon tuvinus Richter, 1977 c g
 Lasiopogon willametti Cole & Wilcox, 1938 i c g b
 Lasiopogon woodorum Cannings, 2002 c g
 Lasiopogon yukonensis Cole and Wilcox, 1938 i c g
 Lasiopogon zaitzevi Lehr, 1984 c g
 Lasiopogon zonatus Cole and Wilcox, 1938 i c g

Data sources: i = ITIS, c = Catalogue of Life, g = GBIF, b = Bugguide.net

References

Further reading

External links

 
 
 

Images representing Lasiopogon

Asilidae genera